The men's 10,000 metres event at the 1996 World Junior Championships in Athletics was held in Sydney, Australia, at International Athletic Centre on 21 August 1996. In the race, there was a mistake in the lap counting of the judges, that caused many athletes to run 24 laps (9600 m) only.

Medalists

Results

Final
21 August

Participation
According to an unofficial count, 29 athletes from 20 countries participated in the event.

References

10,000 metres
Long distance running at the World Athletics U20 Championships